Moonshine is a Canadian television drama series, which premiered on September 14, 2021, on CBC Television. The series stars Jennifer Finnigan as Lidia Bennet, daughter of Ken and Bea Finley-Cullen played by Peter MacNeill and Corrine Koslo, the owners of a ramshackle summer resort on the south shore of Nova Scotia who are keen to retire but whose adult children are battling for control.

The cast also includes Anastasia Phillips, Emma Hunter, Tom Stevens, Alexander Nunez, Erin Darke, Farid Yazdani, Calem MacDonald, Allegra Fulton and Jonathan Silverman.

Created by Sheri Elwood for Six Eleven Media and Entertainment One, the series was first announced in 2020 under the working title Feudal.

Following the conclusion of the first season, the CBC announced that the series was renewed for a second season, which is slated to add Allan Hawco to the cast. The series was released on Amazon Freevee in the U.K. on March 10, 2023, with both seasons and all 16 episodes on the platform at launch, with its launch in Germany happening on the same day and a US release is to be announced by the service at a later date.

Episodes

Season 1 (2021)

Season 2 (2022)

Critical response
John Doyle of The Globe and Mail wrote that the series had some good and fun aspects, but "there is, literally, too much going on. It’s like there are several series packed into one, and some of those involved aren’t quite sure which one they’re starring in."

References

External links

2021 Canadian television series debuts
2020s Canadian drama television series
CBC Television original programming
Television shows set in Nova Scotia
Television shows filmed in Nova Scotia
Television series by Entertainment One